Canal Hollywood is a movies cable channel available in Spain and Portugal. For most of its history it was a single channel airing for all Iberia with feeds in Portuguese or Spanish, it later split. In 2011 was created a version in HD in Spain and Portugal.

Canal Hollywood Portugal is a Portuguese  basic cable and satellite television owned by Dreamia (AMC Networks International Iberia and NOS), Canal Hollywood was founded in 1993, and was one of the first Iberian cable channels ever. It presents movies by all of the major studios. The Portuguese version is one of the most successful cable channels in Portugal, occasionally suppressing RTP2 ratings. It also became available via cable, satellite or IPTV in Angola, Mozambique and Cape Verde.

See also 
Odisea
AMC Networks International Iberia

References

External links 
 Canal Hollywood

AMC Networks International
Television networks in Portugal
Television stations in Spain
Portuguese-language television stations
Television channels and stations established in 1995
Television stations in France